Charles Edward Fuller (25 May 1919 – 16 November 2004) was an English footballer who represented Great Britain at the 1952 Summer Olympics.

References

External links

1919 births
2004 deaths
English footballers
Footballers at the 1952 Summer Olympics
Olympic footballers of Great Britain
Association football midfielders
Bromley F.C. players